The Gambian People's Party (GPP) was a political party in the Gambia. It was founded by Assan Musa Camara in February 1986 and formally launched on 29 March 1986. GPP was a splinter group of the governing People's Progressive Party. The party got 15.5% of the votes in the 1987 parliamentary elections and 7.96% in the 1992 elections, but it never won a parliamentary seat. Camara contested as the presidential candidate of the party in 1987, and got 29,428 votes (14%). In the 1992 presidential election, he got 8% of the votes.
 
The party was banned after the 1994 military coup, and its leading members barred from participating in politics.

References 

Political parties established in 1986
Defunct political parties in the Gambia
1986 establishments in the Gambia